Bantenese may refer to:
 Something of, from, or related to Banten
 Bantenese language, a dialect of Sundanese language spoken in Java, Indonesia
 Bantenese people, a Sundanese community of people living in Banten, Java, Indonesia